The Ledbury and Gloucester Railway (also known as the Daffodil Line), was a railway line in Herefordshire and Gloucestershire, England, running between Ledbury and Gloucester. It opened in 1885 and closed in 1964.

History
Most of the line was built over the route of the southern section of the Herefordshire and Gloucestershire Canal, which had opened in 1798.

Construction and opening
After a period of financial struggle the canal was leased to the Great Western Railway (GWR) in 1863 and in 1881 work started on conversion to a railway. The railway was built by two companies, the Newent Railway and the Ross and Ledbury Railway. The line was inspected by Colonel F. H. Rich in July 1885 and opened on 27 July. It was operated by the GWR with which both of the smaller companies were amalgamated in 1892.

Closure
The line closed to passenger traffic in 1959, with the Dymock to Gloucester section remaining open to goods traffic until 1964.

Route
The line followed a south and then south-easterly route between Ledbury railway station and Gloucester Central railway station, it joined the Gloucester to Newport Line at Over Junction. Stations were constructed at Ledbury Town Halt, Greenway Halt, Dymock, Four Oaks Halt, Newent, Malswick Halt and Barbers Bridge. An interesting skew bridge that carried the line across Hereford Road in Ledbury remains in use as part of the Ledbury Town Trail footpath.<ref name="norton">

References

Rail transport in Gloucestershire
Rail transport in Herefordshire
Great Western Railway constituents
Railway lines opened in 1885
Railway lines closed in 1964